The British Society for Middle Eastern Studies (BRISMES) is a British organization whose purpose is to encourage and advance the study of the Middle East in the United Kingdom. It was established in 1973 and publishes the British Journal of Middle Eastern Studies.

References

Further reading

External links
Official website

1973 establishments in the United Kingdom
Organizations established in 1973
Middle Eastern studies in the United Kingdom